William Harry Patterson (11 March 1859 – 3 May 1946) was an English amateur cricketer who played during the latter part of the 19th century.

Patterson was educated at Harrow School and Pembroke College, Oxford. A right-handed batsman who occasionally bowled, he was awarded his cricket Blue at Oxford University in 1880 and 1881. In 1881 he scored a century for Oxford against Cambridge while suffering from a broken finger. He was the joint captain of Kent County Cricket Club between 1890 and 1893.

References

External links

1859 births
1946 deaths
English cricketers
Kent cricketers
Kent cricket captains
Oxford University cricketers
I Zingari cricketers
Gentlemen cricketers
Gentlemen of England cricketers
People educated at Harrow School
Alumni of Pembroke College, Oxford
North v South cricketers
Over 30s v Under 30s cricketers
Oxford and Cambridge Universities Past and Present cricketers
Lord March's XI cricketers
Gentlemen of Kent cricketers